Brian Gibbons (born July 7, 1947) is a Canadian retired professional ice hockey defenceman who played in 226 games in the World Hockey Association.

External links

1947 births
Living people
Canadian ice hockey defencemen
Cleveland Barons (1937–1973) players
Denver Spurs (WHA) players
Denver Spurs (WHL) players
Fort Worth Wings players
Hamilton Red Wings (OHA) players
Ice hockey people from Newfoundland and Labrador
Ottawa Civics players
Ottawa Nationals players
San Diego Gulls (WHL) players
Sportspeople from St. John's, Newfoundland and Labrador
Springfield Kings players
Toronto Toros players
Tucson Mavericks players
Canadian expatriate ice hockey players in the United States